Joe Stote sometimes called Stotes, is the former percussionist/keyboard player for experimental/progressive rock band, 3. Prior to 3, he played guitar in the band Peacebomb, whose most notable appearance was during the Woodstock '94 Festival, in Saugerties, NY.

Joe Stote was also a founding member of the rock band The Hybrids.  The Hybrids formed in 'The Euphoric Bubble' that is Davis & Elkins College in 1984.  Many of the members have since gone on to have successful musical careers. They still perform live every year or so.

References

Discography with 3 
Summercamp Nightmare (2003, Planet Noise)
Wake Pig (2004, Planet Noise / 2005, Metal Blade)
These Iron Bones (2007, iTunes exclusive)
The End is Begun (2007, Metal Blade)

American percussionists
Year of birth missing (living people)
Living people
Place of birth missing (living people)